The Sassov (also Sassow) Hasidic dynasty began with Rabbi Moshe Leib Erblich of Sassov (1745–1807), a disciple of Rabbi Dovber of Mezeritch, the disciple of the Baal Shem Tov, the founder of Hasidism.

Sassov was located in Eastern Galicia, and is now in Ukraine.

Subsequent Sassover Rebbes 

There is a Sassover Rebbe in Elizabeth, New Jersey, Grand Rabbi Yoel Meir Erblich, who is a nephew of Grand Rabbi Yaakov Tzvi Erblich (d. 2020), son of Grand Rabbi Moshe Yehudah Erblich (d. 1991), Sassover Rebbe, son of Grand Rabbi Yaakov Tzvi Erblich, Porosover Rebbe, son of Grand Rabbi Yekusiel Shmelka Erblich (1800–1861), son of Rebbe Moshe Leib Sassover (1745–1807), founder of the Sassov dynasty.

Appropriation of the Sassover name 

In the late 19th century, the descendants of Rabbi Moishe Leib of Sassov had become rabbis in other cities. The town people found themselves without a Rebbe. They asked Rabbi Sholom Rokeach, known as the Sar Shalom of Belz, for guidance as to whom to appoint as Rebbe. He advised them to nominate his grandson, Rabbi Shlomo, who, although not from the lineage of the Sassover dynasty of Rebbe Moshe Leib, appropriated the title "Rebbe of Sassov". Rabbi Shlomo's father was the first Rebbe of Alesk and his mother was the daughter of the Sar Shalom. Rabbi Shlomo died in 1919. Rabbi Lipa Meir Teitelbaum, a great-grandson of Rabbi Shlomo "of Sassov" and the founder of Kiryat Yismach Moshe in Ganei Tikva, in Israel, was the "Sassov"-Keretzky Rebbe. In his first marriage, he was the son-in-law of Rabbi Joel Teitelbaum of Satmar. He died in March 1966, and was subsequently succeeded by his two sons (both from his second marriage to Rebbetzin Bluma): Grand Rabbi Yoseph Dovid Teitelbaum, the "Sassover Rebbe" in Kiryat Yismach Moshe and a son-in-law of Grand Rabbi David Moshe of Kretchnif (Rabbi Yoseph Dovid was a disciple of the previous Klausenberger Rebbe) and Rabbi Chanoch Henoch Teitelbaum, the "Sassover Rebbe" in Monsey, New York.

See also
History of the Jews in Poland
History of the Jews in Galicia (Central Europe)
History of the Jews in Ukraine

References 

Chernobyl (Hasidic dynasty)
Hasidic dynasties
Hasidic Judaism in Israel
Hasidic Judaism in the United States
Jewish Galician (Eastern Europe) history